A People's House is a European type of leisure, cultural and community centre.

People's House may also refer to:

Buildings
 People's house (United Kingdom), a building specification proposed by Harold Macmillan
 Halkevleri (meaning "People's House"), a 20th-century Turkish state sponsored community project
 United States Capitol 
 White House
 Vermont State House
 The People's House of Florida, a historic U.S. residence in Tallahassee
 Palace of the Parliament, also known as "People's House" (Casa Poporului) in Bucharest, Romania

Legislatures 
 United States House of Representatives
 House of Representatives (Australia)

See also
 House of the People (disambiguation)
 Casa del pueblo
 Casa Pueblo (disambiguation)
 Casapueblo (disambiguation)